Mykolaivka or Nikolaevka is an urban-type settlement in the west of Odesa Oblast, Ukraine. Population: 

Mykolaivka is located on the banks of the Chychykleia River, a right tributary of the Southern Bug, at the border with Mykolaiv Oblast.

History
Mykolaivka was founded in 1791.  The area was settled after 1792, when the lands between the Southern Bug and the Dniester were transferred to Russia according to the Iasi Peace Treaty. Until mid-20th century, it was known as Mykolaivka Druha.

Economy

Transportation
Mykolaivka has road access to the Highway M05 which connects Kyiv and Odesa.

References

Urban-type settlements in Berezivka Raion